Whitley Lower is a village and former civil parish in Kirklees, West Yorkshire England.  The parish church, dedicated to St Mary and St Michael, is part of the united benefice of Thornhill and Whitley which also includes Briestfield. The church was Grade II listed in 1985. In 1891 the civil parish had a population of 879.

See also
Listed buildings in Dewsbury

References

External links 

Villages in West Yorkshire
Former civil parishes in West Yorkshire
Geography of Dewsbury